DeLong House or Delong House or variations may refer to:

A. E. C. Cottage No. 23, also known as DeLong Cottage, Anchorage, Alaska, listed on the National Register of Historic Places (NRHP)
Zopher Delong House, Glens Falls, New York
Harrison DeLong House, Sioux Falls, South Dakota, listed on the NRHP in Minnehaha County
Homer B. DeLong House, Clinton, Wisconsin, listed on the NRHP in Rock County, Wisconsin
Henry and Elizabeth Delong House, Waupaca, Wisconsin, listed on the NRHP in Waupaca County, Wisconsin

See also
DeLong Agricultural Implements Warehouse, Lexington, KY, NRHP-listed, listed on the NRHP in Fayette County, Kentucky